1981 Emperor's Cup Final was the 61st final of the Emperor's Cup competition. The final was played at National Stadium in Tokyo on January 1, 1982. Nippon Kokan won the championship.

Overview
Nippon Kokan won their 1st title, by defeating Yomiuri 2–0. Nippon Kokan was featured a squad consisting of Koji Tanaka, Nobuo Fujishima and Toshio Matsuura.

Match details

See also
1981 Emperor's Cup

References

Emperor's Cup
1981 in Japanese football
Tokyo Verdy matches